The Croatian Christian Democrats was a Christian-democratic political party in Bosnia and Herzegovina. It merged with the Croatian Party of Rights of Bosnia and Herzegovina.

References

Christian democratic parties in Europe
Conservative parties in Bosnia and Herzegovina
Croat political parties in Bosnia and Herzegovina